Branislav Fodrek (born 5 February 1981) is a Slovak football coach and a former midfielder. He is the head coach of the Slovakia national under-18 team.

External links

1981 births
Living people
Footballers from Bratislava
Slovak footballers
Association football midfielders
Slovakia international footballers
ŠK Slovan Bratislava players
FC Saturn Ramenskoye players
Russian Premier League players
Slovak expatriate footballers
FC Petržalka players
Szombathelyi Haladás footballers
FC DAC 1904 Dunajská Streda players
Slovak Super Liga players
Slovak expatriate sportspeople in Russia
Expatriate footballers in Russia
Slovak expatriate sportspeople in Hungary
Expatriate footballers in Hungary
Slovak football managers